The Calpini are a tribe of fruit-piercing moths in the family Erebidae; formerly they were included in the family Noctuidae. The proboscis of the adult moths of this tribe is pointed and barbed, allowing the moth to pierce the skin of fruit to drink the juice. The vampire moths in the genus Calyptra can pierce mammal skin to drink blood.

Genera
 Africalpe Krüger, 1939
 Calyptra Ochsenheimer, 1816
 Ferenta Walker, [1858]
 Gonodonta Hübner, 1818
 Graphigona Walker, [1858]
 Oraesia Guenée, In Boisduval and Guenée, 1852b
 Plusiodonta Guenée, In Boisduval and Guenée, 1852b
 Tetrisia Walker, 1867

Notes

References

External links

Calpinae
Moth tribes